Swing the Statue! is the second album by American singer/songwriter Victoria Williams, released in 1990 by Rough Trade Records.

Background
Williams’ debut, 1987's Happy Come Home, received some good critical reviews but made zero commercial impact, selling only fourteen thousand copies. Her original label Geffen was unimpressed by the nonexistent sales and dropped Victoria, after she fired her manager by mail. Early in 1989 her marriage to Peter Case also fell apart.

After her split with Geffen, Victoria would record “Don't Let It Bring You Down” for the Neil Young tribute album The Bridge. She would record her second album in four days early in 1990, focusing on the more joyful of the dozens of songs she had written over the three years since the debut album.

Williams would sign with Rough Trade Records early in 1990, as one of that label's last ever signings. Despite many positive critical reviews, the collapse of Rough Trade would mean Swing the Statue! fared even worse commercially that its predecessor, selling a mere eleven thousand copies.

Track listing

Personnel
Victoria Williams - vocals, acoustic guitar, piano, dulcimer
Willie Aron - electric and acoustic guitar, organ, backing vocals
Andrew Williams - acoustic guitar
Don Falzone - upright double bass, acoustic bass
Marty Rifkin - pedal steel guitar
Steven Soles - mandolin, trombone
Byron Berline - fiddle, mandolin
John Philip Shenale - Hammond organ, Kurzweil horns
Michael Blair - drums, Chinese drums, marimba, cowbell, vibraphone, glockenspiel, accordion, organ pedals, washboard, checkerbox, tambourine, backing vocals
David Williams - piano, backing vocals
Melissa Hasin - cello on "Wobbling"
Buddy Miller - vocals, guitar on "Lift Him Up"
Julie Miller - vocals on "Lift Him Up"

References

1990 albums
Rough Trade Records albums